Georges Leygues was a French light cruiser of the . During World War II, she served with both Vichy France and Allies. She was named for the prominent 19th and 20th-century French politician Georges Leygues.

Design and description
The La Galissonnière class was designed as an enlarged and improved version of the preceding . Their crew consisted of 557 men in peacetime and 612 in wartime.

At the start of World War II, she was assigned to the Force de Raid, patrolling the Atlantic in response to German commerce raids. To pre-empt the potential Italian threat, Georges Leygues and other French warships were moved to Mers-el-Kebir (now Oran) on 24 April 1940.

The 3rd and 4th Cruiser Divisions, including Georges Leygues avoided the destruction of the French Fleet at Mers-el-Kebir and eventually put into Toulon. The flotilla refuelled at Casablanca and continued to Dakar, arriving on 14 September.

The three cruisers left Dakar on 18 September, intending to go south to Libreville, but they were intercepted by Allied forces, including the heavy cruiser . Montcalm and Georges Leygues outran the Allied ships and returned to Dakar, where they helped to defend the port against the unsuccessful British and Free French attack (Operation Menace) on 23–25 September 1940. Georges Leygues hit Australia twice and avoided Fleet Air Arm torpedo attacks. Gloire, slowed by mechanical troubles and, unable to escape, had been ordered back to Casablanca.

Apart from a transport of bullion to Casablanca in August 1941, the next two years were uneventful until the Allied landings in North Africa (Operation Torch) and the German occupation of Vichy France, when she joined the Allies, as did other French warships. Early in 1943, she began Atlantic patrols from Dakar, and on 13 April, she intercepted the German blockade runner Portland, which was scuttled by her crew.

Georges Leygues was refitted at Philadelphia Naval Shipyard, from July until October 1943, removing the aircraft installations and adding light anti-aircraft weapons.

Georges Leygues''' returned to Dakar based anti-blockade-runner patrols. She then supported Allied landings in Normandy at Omaha Beach in June 1944 and southern France in August. A French naval tradition says that beyond five months of campaigning, the war flag of a ship gets longer by one metre for each month spent off France; the war flag of Georges Leygues is said to have been  when she entered Toulon on 13 September 1944.

She then bombarded the Italian Riviera coastline around Genoa until March 1945. This was her last action of the war.

She had a major refit at Casablanca from May to the end of January 1946. In 1954, along with Montcalm'', she was used for fire support in Indochina. In 1956, she took part in the Suez Crisis, during which she led a group of French warships providing fire support for Israeli ground forces in the Gaza Strip.

The ship was nicknamed "George's Legs" by the British.

Citations

Bibliography

External links 
  netmarine.net
  La flotte française le Jour J
  Croiseur Georges Leygues 

La Galissonnière-class cruisers
Naval ships of Operation Neptune
Ships built in France
World War II cruisers of France
1936 ships